Cape Verde Time (CVT) is a time zone used by the Atlantic island nation of Cape Verde. The zone is one hour behind UTC (UTC-01:00).

Daylight saving time is not observed in this time zone.

Time zones
Time in Africa